Water polo events were contested at the 1981 Summer Universiade in Bucharest, Romania.

References
 Universiade water polo medalists on HickokSports

1981 Summer Universiade
Universiade
1981
1981
1981 in Romanian sport